Virginia Miller may refer to:
Virginia Miller (athlete) (born 1979), American heptathlete
Virginia L. Miller, American microbiologist
Virginia M. Miller, American surgeon